Sergio Kalaj (born 28 January 2000) is a professional footballer who plays as a centre-back for Italian  club Frosinone. Born in Italy, he represents Albania internationally.

Club career
On 12 September 2020, he joined Serie C club Grosseto on loan.

On 22 July 2021 he joined Carrarese on permanent basis.

On 13 January 2022, he signed a 4.5-year contract with Frosinone in Serie B.

References

External links

2000 births
Living people
People from Marino, Lazio
Italian people of Albanian descent
Albanian footballers
Italian footballers
Association football defenders
Serie B players
Serie C players
A.S.D. Città di Marino Calcio players
A.S. Roma players
S.S. Lazio players
U.S. Grosseto 1912 players
Carrarese Calcio players
Frosinone Calcio players
Albania youth international footballers
Albania under-21 international footballers
Footballers from Lazio
Sportspeople from the Metropolitan City of Rome Capital